Samuel Adams Green (May 20, 1940 – March 4, 2011) was an American art curator and director, most associated with his promotion of American pop art, particularly the early works of his friend Andy Warhol.

Early life
Born in Boston on May 20, 1940, his father Samuel Magee Green was Dean of Fine Arts at Wesleyan University and descended from Samuel Adams, one of the Founding Fathers of the United States. His mother was also a university arts lecturer.

During his childhood, his parents gave him a love of art and architecture, which led to him enrolling at the Rhode Island School of Design. However, bored with academic life, Green left after one year and moved to New York City, where he joined the local art scene.

Contemporary art curator
In 1962 aged 22, he was introduced to the avant-garde art dealer Richard Bellamy, owner of the Green Gallery on 57th Street. Amused by the coincidence of their names, Bellamy hired Green on the spot to man the galleries front desk. Art writer John Gruen later described Green Gallery as "An important stepping-stone for every major American Pop artist". After Andy Warhol's friend Ted Carey saw the works of James Rosenquist there - when Warhol was without a gallery, and still working as an illustrator - he suggested that Warhol try to engage the owner. In 1963 Warhol befriended Green in the gallery (assuming that Green was the son of the owner named "Green"), looking for an outlet for his artworks.

Warhol and Green became friends, and Green displayed a few of Warhol's early works at the gallery. Green also acted as an assistant to one of Warhol's film projects, where they spent the summer on Long Island and in The Hamptons, persuading wealthy socialites to let them film naked models in their bathrooms. Green later appeared in Warhol's films Batman Dracula (1963) and Soap Opera (1964).

After six months at the gallery, through his father, Green secured the loan of over 50 works of art, which he intended to exhibit at the Davison Art Center at Wesleyan University. The exhibition included Warhol pieces and other leading contemporary artists including Tom Wesselmann's Great American Nude #39, and Yayoi Kusama's Ten Guest Table.

In 1965, Green left the gallery and at the age of 25 became director of the Institute of Contemporary Art, Philadelphia. Creating his first museum exhibition, he asked Warhol for what would make up the bulk of the exhibition works, which was also the artist's first retrospective. Green chose Warhol's S&H Green Stamps as the 40x40cm invitations he sent out for the preview – and for the design of the silk tie that he wore under his white Gucci evening suit. However, as Warhol was not signing anything that year, Green signed all of the invitations "Andy Warhol, 1965". In an exhibition space that nominally held 300 people, Green invited 6,000, resulting in the mass-mobbing of Warhol and Edie Sedgwick. After the exhibition ended, Warhol had left his original dealer Eleanor Ward, and signed with Leo Castelli.

After three years, in 1967 having been refused permission to organize a campuswide sculpture exhibition at the University of Pennsylvania, Green "abandoned the philistines" and created an exhibition in the city's museum that included works by Barnett Newman, Tony Smith, and Philip Johnson. The resultant success allowed him to return to New York City's art scene as an acknowledged master of contemporary art installation.

Appointed a cultural adviser by the city's mayor John Lindsay, six months later in 1967 Green realized Claes Oldenburg's first outdoor public monument beside the Metropolitan Museum of Art. Placid Civic Monument took the form of a Conceptual performance/action, with a crew of gravediggers digging a 6-by-3-foot rectangular hole in the ground. To then protest against the proposed redevelopment of Easter Island as a United States Air Force refueling station, Green shut down the 59th Street Bridge and both lanes of Park Avenue to allow installation of a giant Moai head sculpture in the forecourt of Seagram's Plaza. The USAF redevelopment plans were stopped by Congress shortly afterwards.

Socialite
After being introduced to Cecil Beaton in the summer of 1969, Green "retired" from the art gallery scene from 1970 to accompany Beaton as his assistant around Europe. Through the noted British photographer, Green greatly escalated the breadth and power of his social network, making many new and influential friends.

In 1971, the actress Candy Darling moved in with Green. In a note written shortly before she died, she referred to Green as "a true friend and noble person".

Barbara Daly Baekeland

In 1969, he met the married Barbara Daly Baekeland, with whom he started an affair. Green was later introduced to her son Antony, about whom Green was very unimpressed by his artistic capabilities. After six weeks, Green broke off the relationship, although Barbara was still obsessed by Green. She pursued him relentlessly, and when she returned to the United States that fall, walked barefoot across Central Park in the snow wearing nothing but a Lynx fur coat to demand entry to his apartment.

In 1972, Antony killed his mother at her apartment in Chelsea, London. The 2007 film Savage Grace, starring Julianne Moore, cast Hugh Dancy as Green, who in one scene is involved in a ménage à trois with Barbara and Antony. After the film opened, Green wrote an article pointing out that elements of the film were factually inaccurate:

Green then embarked on legal action against the film makers which was still unresolved at the time of his death. The case was ultimately settled confidentially by his Estate.

Greta Garbo

The well connected Baroness Cecile de Rothschild's summer home was located in Saint-Raphaël, Var on the French Riviera. In the first summer that he assisted Beaton, Green accompanied him to stay at Rothschild's house. Rothschild had been concerned for her friend, the by-then retired actress Greta Garbo, and so began vetting Green to be a new companion for her. On Garbo's 65th birthday -- September 18, 1970 -- Rothschild introduced the pair at a birthday party she had arranged at her home in Saint-Raphaël. The following winter, 1971, Rothschild invited Green to a party at her apartment in New York, which became the first occasion on which Green walked Garbo home. It was not until late 1972 that Green first entered Garbo's apartment, amazed to find that she kept her artworks permanently covered, to avoid having to cover them when she was out of town.

Green quickly learned that he and Garbo had little in common apart from a love of walking and of silliness; but they formed an immediate bond which would last fifteen years. However, in all the years that Green knew Garbo, he never revealed that Mercedes de Acosta's sister Maria Chandler was his godmother; Garbo had cut Mercedes de Acosta off after the publication of de Acosta's tell-all autobiography, so Green never mentioned her name. Garbo later ostracized Beaton, after he claimed in his book  My Bolivian Aunt, published in 1971, that the pair had been lovers.

Whenever Garbo and Green were both in New York, they would walk twice a week, regardless of the weather. It is thought by some that Garbo wore many layers of clothes and large sunglasses to avoid notice. Garbo also stayed at Green's houses in both Fire Island, New York, and Cartagena, Colombia, both isolated locations.

Their main relationship was undertaken by telephone. They had a regular morning call:

At an early stage, Green informed Garbo that as an art dealer, he often recorded his telephone calls. Garbo made no immediate protest, and Green never violated the understanding that the recordings would not be exploited in any way during or after her lifetime.

In the fall of 1985, while Green was in Colombia, Green's assistant spoke to a journalist working for the American tabloid newspaper, The Globe. On October 29, the headline read "Garbo to wed at 80 - bridegroom will be art dealer 30 years her junior". Upon his return to New York, Green rang Garbo to arrange a walk, to which she responded: "Mr. Green, you've done a terrible thing." The relationship ended at that point, with Garbo's friends later adding that she had heard that Green had played their tape recordings over a dinner party, an accusation which Green categorically denied.

After her death five years later at 11:30AM on Easter Sunday, April 15, 1990, Green learned that around that period, due to her failing physical and mental health, Garbo had also cut many other close friends out of her life. Green in his last will and testament bequeathed all 100 hours of the tapes, which make up one of the most important records of the last 50 years of Garbo's life, to Wesleyan University.

Yoko Ono and John Lennon
Green, an admirer of New York-resident Japanese artist Yayoi Kusama, met her flat mate Yoko Ono in the 1960s on one of his regular visits to their apartment.

After Ono married John Lennon in 1969, from 1974 the couple became resident in Manhattan, and would regularly dine with Green. Green managed to obtain an invitation to President Jimmy Carter's January 1976 Inauguration, to which he invited John and Yoko as guests. In the summer of 1976, Green used his connections at the Egyptian Museum to get the couple access to an archaeological dig in Egypt.

In the summer of 1979, Lennon named Green as Sean Lennon's guardian should he and Yoko be killed together. After the murder of Lennon in 1980, Green always spoke well of his friend, and would commemorate the occasion annually at Mortimer's dining club on East 75th Street.

Preservationist
For the last 30 years of his life from the early 1980s onwards, Green worked to preserve various ancient art installations around the world, including Bhutanese monasteries and Buddhas carved in the mountainsides of Sri Lanka. To expand and sustain his work, in 1997 Green established the Landmarks Foundation, by the time of his death one of America's leading organizations for historic preservation. About this work he observed:

Death
At the time of Green's death, the ICA in Philadelphia was planning an exhibition based on his 1965 exhibition of Warhol's work. The exhibition (titled "That's How We Escaped": Reflections on Warhol) ran at the ICA from April 21 to August 7, 2011.

References

External links
Landmarks Foundation
Samuel Adams Green Papers. General Collection, Beinecke Rare Book and Manuscript Library, Yale University.

People from Boston
1940 births
2011 deaths
People from New York City
Adams political family
American socialites
American art curators